The 1985 Pacific Tigers football team represented the University of the Pacific (UOP) in the 1985 NCAA Division I-A football season as a member of the Pacific Coast Athletic Association.

The team was led by head coach Bob Cope, in his third year, and played their home games at Pacific Memorial Stadium in Stockton, California. They finished the season with a record of five wins and seven losses (5–7, 2–5 PCAA). The Tigers were outscored by their opponents 292–301 over the season.

Schedule

Team players in the NFL
The following UOP players were selected in the 1986 NFL Draft.

Notes

References

Pacific
Pacific Tigers football seasons
Pacific Tigers football